Daag is a 1952 Indian Hindi romantic drama film produced and directed by Amiya Chakravarty. The film stars Dilip Kumar, Nimmi, along with Usha Kiran, Lalita Pawar, Kanhaiyalal, Leela Mishra in pivotal roles. The film's music is composed by Shankar–Jaikishan.

Madhubala was the first choice of Chakravarty to play the female lead in the movie, but she was left it because of hectic schedule. She was also shooting for Tarana and Sangdil at this time, which starred her alongside Kumar.

Dilip Kumar won the first ever Filmfare Award in the Best Actor category for his performance in this film. The Awards were instituted from 1954. The film fared well at the box office and was declared a hit, despite its heavy theme. Got No. 4 in Box-office collection list.

Plot
Shankar (Dilip Kumar) and his mother live a life of poverty. To earn money he makes and sells mud toys. Being the lone breadwinner of the family, he is unable to meet the needs. His debt starts rising steadily when he gets addicted to alcohol. He is attracted to Parvati (Nimmi), a poor neighbour who lives with her stepbrother Jagat Narayan, his wife and their daughter Pushpa (Usha Kiran). After an argument with his mother, Shankar leaves for the city, manages to give up drinking and earns a lot of money. He then returns home and pays off his mortgage. With new confidence he proposes to marry Parvati. But he is then told that Parvati's marriage has been arranged elsewhere. Broken, he starts drinking again and his mother also dies at this stage. He starts drinking heavily and starts walking on the path of self-destruction. The only thing which can save his life is Parvati's love. But her parents are an obstacle as they believe that the alcoholic Shankar can never become a good man in life. In a dramatic turns of events, however, Jagat Narayan agrees to get Parvati married to him. Shankar  again manages to quit the drinking habit and the film finally finishes with a happy ending.

Cast
 Dilip Kumar as Shankar 
 Nimmi as Parvati "Paro" 
 Usha Kiran as Pushpa "Pushpi"
 Lalita Pawar as Shankar's Mother 
 Kanhaiyalal as Lala Jagatnarayan 
 Leela Mishra as Mrs. Jagatnarayan
 C. S. Dubey as Heera 
 Jawahar Kaul as Shyam Sundar 
 Krishnakant as Money Lender 
 Laxman Rao as Raghunath

Music
Composed by Shankar Jaikishan, the songs of the film are written by Shailendra and Hasrat Jaipuri.

Awards
Filmfare Best Actor Award for Dilip Kumar

References

External links 
 

1952 films
1950s Hindi-language films
Films scored by Shankar–Jaikishan
Films directed by Amiya Chakravarty
Indian romantic drama films
1952 romantic drama films
Indian black-and-white films